Oldham R.L.F.C. (known as the Oldham Bears from 1996's Super League I to 1997's Super League II, and nicknamed the Roughyeds) is an English rugby league club who have had numerous notable players (1,361 (excludes pre-1895 season Rugby Football Union players) as of 31 October 2018) throughout their history, each player of the rugby league era who has played (and so excludes non-playing substitutes) in a competitive first-class match (including those matches that were subsequently abandoned, expunged or re-played, but excluding friendlies) is included.

List

 ^¹ = Played For Oldham (Bears) During More Than One Period
 ^² = drop-goals are currently worth 1-point, but from the 1897–98 season to prior to the 1973-74 season all goals, whether; conversions, penalties, or drop-goals, scored two points, consequently during this time drop-goals were often not explicitly documented, and "0²"indicates that drop-goals may not have been recorded, rather than no drop-goals scored. In addition, prior to the 1949–50 season, the Field-goal was also still a valid means of scoring points
 ^³ = During the first two seasons of the Northern Union (now known as the Rugby Football League), i.e. the 1895–96 season and 1896–97 season, conversions were worth 2-points, penalty goals 3-points and drop goals 4-points.
 ¢ = player has (potential) links to other rugby league clubs on Wikipedia
 BBC = BBC2 Floodlit Trophy
 CC = Challenge Cup
 CF = Championship Final
 CM = Captain Morgan Trophy
 LC = Lancashire County Cup
 LL = Lancashire League
 RT = League Cup, i.e. Player's № 6, John Player (Special), Regal Trophy

Hall of Fame
There are currently 19 players included in the club's Hall of Fame:

Fred Ashworth • Alan Davies • Mike Elliott • John Etty • Joe Ferguson • Terry Flanagan  • Bernard Ganley • Alex Givvons • Andrew Goodway • Herman Hilton • Robert Irving • Arthur Lees • Sid Little • Martin Murphy • Harry Ogden • Jack Read • Frank Stirrup • Kevin Taylor • Derek Turner

Notable former players
These players have either; received a Testimonial match, are "Hall of Fame" inductees, played during Oldham Bears' two Super League seasons, were international representatives before, or after, their time at Oldham, or are notable outside of rugby league.

 Les Anthony
 Darren Abram
 Raymond "Ray" Ashton 1984 Great Britain Tourist
 Keith Atkinson (Testimonial match 1993)
 Adrian Belle
 Ben Beynon circa-1920s
 David Bradbury
 Gary Burns
 Joseph "Joe" Collins
 John Clarke circa-1996/97
 James "Jimmy" Cowan
 Martin Crompton
 Ryan Lawton (Loose forward)
 Paul Crook
 Paul Davidson circa-1996-97
 Paul Deacon
 Tom Helm 1910 Great Britain Tourist
 Joe Faimalo  circa-1996/97
 Reg Farrar
 Vince Fawcett
 Frank Foster
 Steve Gartland
 Ian Gildart
 Brett Goldspink  circa-1996/97
 Luke Goodwin circa-1996/97
 Danny Guest
 Shayne McMenemy
 Reece Guy
 Howard Hill
 Viv Huzzey
 Shaun Irwin
 David Jones  circa-1996-97
 Jack 'Bedwellty' Jones
 Jack Keith (Testimonial match 1960)
 Alan Kellett
 Phil Larder (Testimonial match 1979)
 Peaufai "Afi" Leuila  circa-1996-97
 Gary Lord
 Francis Maloney circa-1996-97
 Chris McKinney
 Matt Munro
 Robert Myler
 Mike Neal
 Paul Norman
 John 'Ben' Andrew
 Andrew Patmore
 John A. Power circa-1993-95
 Malcolm Price
 Sean Quinlan
 Scott Ranson
 Craig Richards
 Ian Russell
 Ian Sherratt
 George William Smith 1908–1916
 Peter Smith
 Jack Stephens captain 1929-30/1934-35 P186 T79 G37 P311
 David Stephenson
 Paul Stevens
 Jason Temu
 Paul Topping  circa-1996/97
 Don Vines

References

 
Oldham R.L.F.C.